Inner City (French: État des lieux) is a 1995 film directed by Jean-François Richet. It stars Cyrille Autin and Emmanuelle Bercot. It won an award at the 1995 Avignon Film Festival.

Cast
Cyrille Autin as Samurai
Emmanuelle Bercot as Gary Ainsworth
Anne-Cécile Crapie as Deborah
Andrée Damant as The mother
Marc de Jonge as The attacker
Denis Podalydès as Human Resources director

References

External links

1995 films
French comedy-drama films
Films directed by Jean-François Richet
1990s French-language films
1995 directorial debut films
1990s French films